Susy Garland (30 April 1966 – 10 April 1987) was a British figure skater. She competed at the 1980 Winter Olympics and the 1984 Winter Olympics. She died in a car accident in 1987.

References

External links
 

1966 births
1987 deaths
British female pair skaters
Olympic figure skaters of Great Britain
Figure skaters at the 1980 Winter Olympics
Figure skaters at the 1984 Winter Olympics
Sportspeople from Bristol
Road incident deaths in England